Ten Small Paces is the third studio album by the American indie rock duo Ida, released in 1997 on Simple Machines Records.

Track listing

Personnel
Ida
 Daniel Littleton – guitar, piano, vocals, dobro, violin, capo
 Elizabeth Mitchell – guitar, piano, vocals, bass
 Karla Schickele – bass, vocals, acoustic guitar
 Michael Littleton – drums, vocals, casio

Additional musicians
 Elaine Ahn – cello on "Hilot"
 Chris Rael – theremin on "Les Étoiles Secrètes"  
 Steven Immerwahr – bass on "Blue Moon of Kentucky"
 Ida Pearle – violin on "Ashokan Reservoir" and "Drunk Aviator"

Technical personnel
 Rebecca Jane Gleason – front cover photograph
 Pat Graham – band photos
 Kristin Thomson – layout
 Charlie Pilzer – mastering

References 

1997 albums
Ida (band) albums